Olszyn  is a village in the administrative district of Gmina Rokitno, near Biała Podlaska in eastern Poland, close to the border with Belarus.

References

Villages in Biała Podlaska County